Aníbal Jonathan Gastón Bay (born 1 February 1993) is an Argentine professional footballer who plays as a left-back for Central Córdoba SdE.

Career
Bay's career started with Racing de Córdoba in 2011, remaining with the Torneo Argentino A club for two seasons whilst netting two goals in forty-four games. On 30 June 2013, Bay joined Argentine Primera División side Godoy Cruz. He departed the club eighteen months later without featuring, subsequently securing a move to Torneo Federal A's Talleres. Six appearances followed in 2015 as Talleres won promotion to Primera B Nacional, which preceded a further five in the second tier as the club won a second straight promotion to the Primera División; Bay scored their campaign's final goal, versus Chacarita Juniors on 18 June 2016.

In July 2016, Bay agreed to remain in Primera B Nacional with Ferro Carril Oeste. Gustavo Coleoni selected the defender for his debut in a match with Central Córdoba on 27 August, which was the first of forty-seven matches he participated in for Ferro across two years; scoring goals against Instituto and San Martín in the process. In 2018, Bay was signed by Central Córdoba.

Career statistics
.

Honours
Talleres
 Torneo Federal A: 2015
 Primera B Nacional: 2016

References

External links

1993 births
Living people
People from Villa Ángela
Argentine footballers
Association football defenders
Torneo Argentino A players
Torneo Federal A players
Primera Nacional players
Racing de Córdoba footballers
Godoy Cruz Antonio Tomba footballers
Talleres de Córdoba footballers
Ferro Carril Oeste footballers
Central Córdoba de Santiago del Estero footballers
Sportspeople from Chaco Province